The Frost Building is a curved 7 and 6 storey office building complex on the south east side of Queen's Park Crescent in Toronto, Ontario, Canada. The building is owned by the Government of Ontario and is part of the large Queen's Park campus. The Frost Building is home to various ministries of the Ontario government, primarily the Ministries of Finance and Treasury Board Secretariat.  It is divided into a north block (6 storey building was home, in 2014, to parts of the Ministry of Finance and Ministry of Infrastructure) and a south block (7 storey), with the north block located on 95 Grosvenor Street and the south block located on 7 Queen's Park Crescent. A five-storey glass walkway connects the two blocks from the 2nd and 6th floors.

The building is named after Leslie Frost, Premier of Ontario for more than a decade starting in 1949.

The Frost Building is also commonly referred to as the Ontario Treasury Building. The south block of the building has seven floors; the top floor housing the Office of the Minister of Finance and the Office of the Deputy Minister of Finance. The current Finance Minister of Ontario is Peter Bethlenfalvy and the Deputy Minister of Finance is Greg Orencsak.

The building is a landmark of modern office building architecture in Canada, dating from the early 1950s. It was one of the first totally "modern look"
buildings without any of the fancy curlicues of older buildings. It was also original in that it follows the curve of the street on which it resides. It is named for former Premier of Ontario Leslie Frost. The north block was built in the 1960s as an addition to the South Block.

The Ontario Firefighters' Memorial is located in a small parkette to the southwest corner of the building.

Other government buildings nearby include:

 Ontario Government Buildings - Hearst, Mowat and Hepburn Blocks
 Whitney Block
 Ontario Power Building - shares the curve building design with the Frost Building

The building is served by the Queen's Park (TTC) subway station to the southwest corner.

External links

 Building details South Block
 Building details North Block

Ontario government buildings
Buildings and structures in Toronto
Modernist architecture in Canada